Stanley Foster Reed (1917–2007) was an entrepreneur, inventor, and publisher who founded Reed Research Inc. in 1940, the journal Mergers & Acquisitions in 1965, and the magazine Campaigns & Elections  in 1980.

Biography
Reed was born in Bogota, New Jersey on September 28, 1917, the third son of Beryl Turner Reed and Morton Gilman Reed, and grew up in Hartsdale and White Plains, New York. He started a roofing company and worked briefly at a sheet metal factory for Pittsburgh Steel.  In 1940, at age 23,  he started up a scientific research company, renting a two-story building next to a junk yard along the C & O canal in Georgetown.

Reed lived in McLean, Virginia, for 40 years. In 1981 he earned an MBA from Loyola College in Baltimore, Maryland at the age of 64.  In 1994, he moved to Charleston, S.C. to take a position as the Entrepreneur-in-Residence at the College of Charleston, where he taught advanced management courses. He also lived in  Philadelphia, Pa., Annapolis, Md., an  Culpeper, Va.  On October 25, 2007, in Charlottesville, Va., he died at the University of Virginia Medical Center of a subdural hematoma, at the age of 90.

Career 
Reed started the publications Directors & Boards and of Export Today.   He was the author of several books, including the best-selling  The Art of M & A (co-authored with his daughter, Alexandra Lajoux), and The Toxic Executive.

He built Reed Research, Inc., and the Reed Research Foundation over the next 20 years to a net worth of $1 million.  Along with Manley St. Denis, Johann Martinek, Gordon Yeh, James Ahlgren and others, he worked on issues ranging from safe land mine removal to electrocardiography to language learning laboratories, obtaining scores of patents in the process. Based on his work experience, he was admitted to membership in the Society of Naval Architects and received certification as a Professional Engineer (P.E.).

In 1962, after selling Reed Research to Log-Etronics, Inc., he started Tech-Audit as well as the Reed Research Institute for Creative Studies in the RCA Building on K Street in Washington, where he ran a number of publishing businesses.  In the 1960s, he was actively involved in social issues, sponsoring programs to encourage inner-city entrepreneurship and writing an article on the poor of Appalachia. He also participated as a panelist in seminars of the Aspen Institute and as a guest lecturer at various universities including the University of Colorado’s World Affairs Conference and Georgetown University, where he once discussed ethics.  He was an “ideas man” who in addition to starting publications also started a mergers newsletter and a website in his later years.

Sources
 Bernstein, Adam. "Stanley Reed, 90; Helped Create Niche Magazines", The Washington Post, October 30, 2007. Accessed October 31, 2007.

References

1917 births
2007 deaths
American publishers (people)
People from Bogota, New Jersey
People from McLean, Virginia
People from Hartsdale, New York
People from White Plains, New York